The Hacienda del Pozo de Verona was a mansion designed by architect A. C. Schweinfurth for philanthropist Phoebe Hearst in the Amador Valley near Pleasanton, California. The Hacienda was originally built between 1894 and 1898, with substantial later additions designed by architect Julia Morgan. The design of the Hacienda combined Mission, Pueblo, and Moorish architectural styles. It was destroyed by fire in 1969.

A railroad station named Hacienda (or Hearst) was built on the Western Pacific Railroad to serve the estate.

The property was acquired by a group of businessmen in 1924 and it became the original home of the Castlewood Country Club.

References 

Buildings and structures in the San Francisco Bay Area
1969 disestablishments in California
1890s establishments in California
Buildings and structures demolished in 1969
Pleasanton, California